Bermuda requires its residents to register their motor vehicles and display vehicle registration plates.

Since 1975 Bermudian licence plates issued to general passenger vehicles have five black digits on a plain white background (both front and rear), are European standard 520 mm × 110 mm, and use British stamping dies.  Non-private vehicles have licence plates with one or two preceding letters followed by three or four numbers.

Personalised plates have become available that allow motorists to choose up to seven characters, overlaid on a map of the island with "Bermuda" printed across the top, on a North American standard 6 × 12 inches (152 × 300 mm) sized plate.

See also 
 Vehicle registration plates of British overseas territories

References

Bermuda
Road transport in Bermuda
Bermuda-related lists